Xenocara is the OpenBSD build infrastructure for the project's customised X.Org Server that  utilises a dedicated _x11 user by default to drop privileges and perform privilege separation in accordance to OpenBSD's "least privilege" policy.

Until release 6.9, X.Org used imake but recent modularised versions have switched to GNU autotools. Xenocara uses BSD make and is designed to ease building and maintenance of modularised X.Org within the OpenBSD CVS tree.

Apart from X.Org, Xenocara builds several other projects, including window managers FVWM and cwm.

Adoption 
Xenocara is the default display server for the X Window System for:
 Hyperbola GNU/Linux-libre

References

External links 

 
 CVS repository

BSD software
OpenBSD
X Window System
Software using the MIT license